The Prix Léon-Gérin is an award by the Government of Quebec that is part of the Prix du Québec, which "goes to researchers in one of the social sciences". It is named in honour of Léon Gérin.

Winners

See also

 List of social sciences awards

References
 Award winners 

Social sciences awards
Prix du Québec

Gérin-Lajoie family